Jens Torstensen (11 November 1928 – 30 November 2003) was a Danish footballer. He was part of Denmark's squad at the 1952 Summer Olympics, but he did not play in any matches.

References

1928 births
2003 deaths
Association football forwards
Danish men's footballers
Footballers at the 1952 Summer Olympics